Naqshbandi Tahiri Golden Chain is the spiritual chain of successors of the Naqshbandi Sufi order which descends from Khwaja Muhammad Tahir Bakhshi Naqshbandi commonly known as Sajjan Saeen. The recitation of this golden chain in poetic form is part of the daily practices of a follower in the Naqshbandi Tahiri Sufi order.

The Golden Chain

Notes
 Sayyad Laal Shah Hamdani (36) and Khwaja Sirajuddin Naqshbandi (37) were both Khulafa of Khwaja Muhammad Usman Damani (35). Pir Fazal Ali Qureshi (38) first received khilafat from Sayyad Laal Shah Hamdani (36) and then from Khwaja Sirajuddin Naqshbandi (37). Some other spiritual chains do not mention Sayyad Laal Shah Hamdani as he is not a shaykh of Khwaja Sirajuddin Naqshbandi.
 Similarly, Hafiz Abu Saeed (32) and Shah Ahmed Saeed (33) who was his son, both received Khilafat from Shah Ghulam Ali Dehlavi (31). But since Hafiz Abu Saeed (32) succeeded Shah Ghulam Ali first, and then was followed by Shah Ahmed Saeed, both names are mentioned in the chain.
 Khwaja Ala'uddin Attar (18) and Khwaja Yaqub Charkhi (19) both received Khilafat from Shah Baha'uddin Naqshband (17). But since Khwaja Yaqub Charkhi also received spiritual training from Khwaja Ala'uddin, his name comes after Khwaja Ala'uddin.

See also
Silsila 
Hadith of Golden Chain 
Naqshbandi-Haqqani Golden Chain

References

External links
 Naqshbandi Tahiri Golden Chain (Shajra)
 Biographies of the Naqshbandi Tahiri shaykhs in Urdu
 Poetic version of the Golden Chain in Urdu
 English Translation of the Poetic Golden Chain from Urdu

Naqshbandi order